Karel Pexidr (born 4 November 1929, in Prague, Czechoslovakia) is a Czech writer, lawyer, philosopher and composer of classical music.

Curriculum 
The history of the  Pexidr family goes back to the South-Bohemian town of Protivín, yet both the parents and grandparents of Karel Pexidr lived in Pilsen, where he  has been living  to the present day. However, he was born in the Prague-Podolí maternity hospital (on 4 November 1929).  
After  finished his secondary studies at the classical grammar school in Pilsen in 1948, he went to Prague to study Law at the Legal Faculty of the Charles University.  He was forced to interrupt his studies in 1951 due to    political interventions against certain cultured strata of inhabitants and summoned to more than two years of forced labour at a military type of camp. He was allowed to   finish his studies in 1955, and finally to acquire the academic title of doctor.
Then he worked in the position of a legal specialist in various socialist organizations existing in those times until 1990 when he was entitled to retire.d.  
Between 1993 and 1999 he lectured philosophy at the West-Bohemian University in Pilsen. 
Between 1993 and 2011 he was head of an agricultural cooperative at Horšice near Přeštice.

In 1963 he got married.

Philosophical publications

In Czech  

 Úvod do studia etiky (An introduction to ethic studies), Plzeň: Vydavatelství ZČU 1996
 Relativistická filozofie (Relativist philosophy), Plzeň: Vydavatelství ZČU 1996
 Psychologie a gnozeologie (Psychology and epistemology), Dobrá Voda u Pelhřimova: Aleš Čeněk 2000
 Kosmologie z pohledu filozofa (Cosmology in the view of a philosopher), Dobrá voda u Pelhřimova: Aleš Čeněk 2003
 Kauzalita (Causality), (co-author Nikolaj Demjančuk), Plzeň: Aleš Čeněk 2009
 Filosofie pro každého (Philosophy for everybody), Praha: Alfa nakladatelství 2009
 Člověk, tvor neznámý (Man, an unknown creature), Praha: Alfa nakladatelství 2011
 Filosofické aforismy (Philosophical aphorisms), Praha: Alfa nakladatelství 2012

In English 

 Philosophy for Everyone, Praha: Alfa nakladatelství 2012
 Causality, Cambridgeshire: Melrosebooks 2013
 Man, un Unknown Creature, Cambridgeshire: Melrosebooks 2014
 Philosophical Aphorisms, Cambridgeshire: Melrosebooks 2015
 Relativist Philosophy, Plzeň: Vydavatelství ZČU 2016

Literary works
Pexidr did not find any public outlet for his literary works (much the same as the philosophic ones) before 1989. Down to that turning point the publishing houses under state control would not accept any manuscripts that did not comply with the political, ideological and cultural principles of the Communist regime.

The literary production of Karel Pexidr falls into three types of genre:

Short stories
 Blázniviny (Foolish tales), Plzeň: Nava 1997
 Bajky (Fables), Plzeň: Nava 1999
 Kavkovské kontrapunkty (Kafka counter-points), Plzeň: Perseus 2000
 Přeludy (Illusions), Plzeň: Nava 2007
 Cesty k cíli (Ways to the goal), Praha: Epocha 2014

Non-fiction
 Vícov (Village Vícov), Plzeň: Veselý 1996
 Kalifornie, jak jsem ji viděl (California, as I have seen it), Plzeň: Nava 1999
 Jak žít (How to live), Plzeň: Nava 2006
 Nové vyprávění ze staré Plzně (New narrations from old Pilsen), Plzeň: Nava 2009

Poetry
 Hříčka poezie (Poetic wordplays) – at the author´s expense
 Básně (Poems), Plzeň: Perseus 2003

Musical works
Pexidr has been active musician since his early youth. He deepened his musical education acquired at the Smetana School of Music at Pilsen by further studies and consultations with František Rauch, pianist and professor at the Prague Academy of Music, as well as with composer Dr. Jindřich Feld in Prague.
Pexidr´s musical work counts 119 compositions covering orchestral works, chamber pieces and vocal compositions for voice solo. A number of instructive pieces are dedicated to children.

Awards
 Bohumil Polan Prize, for the collection of short prosaic pieces Illusions (Přeludy), awarded 21 November 2008

References

External links 
http://www.ucl.cas.cz/ceny/?c=10
http://www.webmagazin.cz/index.php?stype=all&id=14778
http://www.rozhlas.cz/vltava/host/_zprava/karel-pexidr-komponista-a-literat--1587981

1929 births
Living people
Writers from Plzeň
Czech classical composers
Czech male classical composers
20th-century classical composers
20th-century Czech people
20th-century Czech male musicians
Musicians from Plzeň